Marmande – Virazeil Airport  is an airport located near Marmande in the Lot-et-Garonne in South West France.

References 

Airports in Nouvelle-Aquitaine
Buildings and structures in Lot-et-Garonne